Ben Queen (born February 7, 1995) is an American politician serving in the West Virginia Senate, representing the 12th district. He served in the West Virginia House of Delegates from the 48th district from 2016 to 2022.

References

1995 births
Living people
Republican Party West Virginia state senators
Republican Party members of the West Virginia House of Delegates
Politicians from Clarksburg, West Virginia
21st-century American politicians